Bedlar's Green is a hamlet in the Uttlesford district of Essex, England adjacent to the village of Great Hallingbury.

Hamlets in Essex
Uttlesford